Gar Günsa, Günsa or Kunsa, is a township consisting of three administrative villages in Gar County in the Ngari Prefecture of the Tibet Autonomous Region of China, viz., Sogmai and Gar Chongsar and Namru
The modern Ngari Gunsa Airport is within the township.

Gar Günsa, along with its sister encampment Gar Yarsa used to be the  administrative headquarters for Western Tibet (Ngari). The headquarters was moved to Shiquanhe in 1965.

Name 

Gar means "encampment". During the 15th and 16th centuries, the Karma Kagyu lamas moved through the length and breadth of Tibet in "Great Encampments" or garchen.
The term is also used often for military camps.

Gar Günsa  means the "winter camp".
The ninth century bilingual text Mahāvyutpatti translated günsa as Sanskrit , literally, the residence of the winter season.
Even though Gar Yarsa has acquired the name "Gartok" in popular parlance, officially, "Gartok" consisted of both Gar Günsa and Gar Yarsa (the "summer camp"). The latter is forty miles upstream on Gartang at a higher altitude.

History

Tibetan administration 
Gar Günsa, along with its sister encampment Gar Yarsa, was referred to as Gartok, and served as Lhasa's administrative headquarters for Western Tibet (Ngari) after it was conquered from Ladakh in 1684. A senior official called Garpön was stationed here.
The Garpöns lived in Gar Gunsa for nine months in the year, and stayed at Gar Yarsa during August–October.

But in the British nomenclature, the name "Gartok" was applied only to Gar Yarsa and the practice continues till date.

Chinese administration 
After the Chinese annexation of Tibet, Gar Günsa continued to function as the headquarters of Western Tibet till 1965, after which it was moved to Shiquanhe. It was felt that the living conditions in Gar Günsa were extremely difficult.

See also
 List of towns and villages in Tibet

References

Bibliography

External links 
 Günsa Township, OpenStreetMap, retrieved 21 July 2021.

Populated places in Ngari Prefecture